Brooke Michelle McCarty-Williams (born October 2, 1995) is an American professional basketball player who played for the Dallas Wings of the Women's National Basketball Association (WNBA). She currently plays for Luleå Basket in the Swedish Basketball League.

College career
McCarty-Williams starred for Texas as soon as she arrived on campus, making the Big 12 All-Freshman team in her first year, 2015.  She continued on to make the All Big 12 First Team in each of the next three seasons.  In 2018, her senior year, she was also a USA Today Third Team All-American, and a AP All American Honorable Mention.  She was also named to the Big 12 Tournament team in her senior season.  In total, she played in 139 games for the Longhorns, scoring 1,619 points.

Texas statistics

Source

WNBA career
McCarty-Williams was undrafted in the 2018 WNBA Draft.  She participated in training camp with the Los Angeles Sparks, but was ultimately cut from the roster.  In the following year, 2019, McCarty-Williams participated in training camp with the Dallas Wings, and made the roster.  She made her WNBA debut on May 24, 2019 vs. the Atlanta Dream.  She played 29 minutes, and scored 8 points in a 72–76 loss.

Career statistics

WNBA

|-
| style="text-align:left;" | 
| style="text-align:left;" | Dallas
| 34 || 3 || 13.1 || .289 || .360 || .971 || 1.3 || 1.9 || 0.4 || 0.0 || 0.8 || 2.4

Personal life
McCarty-Williams is married to Kamron Williams, an officer in the All-Volunteer Force of the U.S. Navy.

References

External links
 Brooke McCarty on Twitter
 Brooke McCarty on Instagram
 WNBA profile
 Texas profile

1995 births
Living people
People from League City, Texas
People from Madisonville, Texas
American women's basketball players
Basketball players from Texas
Guards (basketball)
Texas Longhorns women's basketball players
Los Angeles Sparks players
Dallas Wings players